George Goodwin Jr. (April 23, 1786 – February 8, 1878) was an American publisher, businessman, and politician.

Goodwin was the fourth child and third son of George Goodwin and Mary (Edwards) Goodwin, of Hartford, where he was born, April 23, 1786.

He graduated from Yale College in 1806.  At the time of his death he was, with the exception of one of his classmates, the oldest living graduate of the college. Two of his brothers graduated there in 1807 and 1823.

Soon after leaving college he went into the grocery business in Hartford, in which he continued till about 1816. In 1818 the firm of Hudson & Goodwin, of which his father was a member, was dissolved, and the firm of George Goodwin & Sons succeeded to the business of printing, publishing and bookselling—the leading interest then being the issue of the Connecticut Courant, a weekly paper, of which they retained control until 1836, and for which, as well as for other publications, they manufactured the paper at their mill in East Hartford. To give more attention to this manufacture, which gradually became their leading business, George Goodwin Jr. removed to East Hartford in 1821, where he spent an active and useful life until 1861, when the mills passed into other hands. Soon after this his sight began to fail, and in 1868 he became totally blind. He bore this trial with Christian submission, keeping up to the last his interest in books and general affairs. He represented East Hartford three times in the Connecticut Legislature.   He died at his home in Burnside, East Hartford, Conn., February 8, 1878.

He was married, Nov. 25, 1809, to Maria, eldest daughter of Andrew Kingsbury, of Hartford, who died in 1851. Of their ten children, six survived him.

External links

1786 births
1878 deaths
Yale College alumni
Businesspeople from Hartford, Connecticut
Members of the Connecticut General Assembly
American publishers (people)
19th-century American politicians
Politicians from Hartford, Connecticut
19th-century American businesspeople